Mayberry R.F.D. (abbreviation for Rural Free Delivery) is an American television series produced as a spin-off continuation of The Andy Griffith Show. When star Andy Griffith decided to leave his series, most of the supporting characters returned for the retitled program, which ran for three seasons (78 episodes) on the CBS Television Network from 1968 to 1971.

During the eighth and final season of The Andy Griffith Show, widower farmer Sam Jones (Ken Berry) and his young son Mike (Buddy Foster) are introduced and gradually become the show's focus. Sheriff Andy Taylor takes a back seat in the storylines, establishing the new premise. Sheriff Taylor and newlywed wife Helen made guest appearances on Mayberry R.F.D. until late 1969 before they relocated with Opie. Mayberry R.F.D. was popular throughout its entire run but was canceled after its third season in CBS's "rural purge" of 1971.

Plot and characters

Father and son stories involving Sam and Mike Jones are reminiscent of the episodes that starred Andy Griffith. Both characters are introduced in the last season of The Andy Griffith Show (TAGS), beginning with Sam's election as head of the town council. Most of the town folk from TAGS continued their roles. Loyal Mayberry citizens Goober Pyle (George Lindsey), Clara Edwards (Hope Summers), Emmett Clark (Paul Hartman) and Howard Sprague (Jack Dodson) are seen regularly.

Sheriff Andy Taylor and his sweetheart, Helen Crump (Aneta Corsaut), marry in the new title's first episode. Both Andy and Helen make additional appearances during the first season (mostly Andy, who remains Sheriff of Mayberry in the early appearances.) Griffith and Coursaut leave the series for good in late 1969 with a move to Charlotte, North Carolina, as the explanation.  Aunt Bee (Frances Bavier) becomes Sam's housekeeper but leaves after the second season to be replaced by Sam's cousin, Alice Cooper (Alice Ghostley). Don Knotts as Barney Fife and Ronny Howard as Opie Taylor both appear in the first episode, with Barney serving as Andy's best man for the wedding. Actress Arlene Golonka (who played Howard Sprague's sweetheart Millie Hutchins/Swanson in the Griffith show) becomes Sam's love interest in the retitled seasons. A recurring character named Ralph (Charles Lampkin) lives with a teen daughter and pre-teen son next to the Jones farm. Mary Lansing appeared occasionally as Emmett's wife, Martha. As with its predecessor, Mayberry R.F.D. continued under the sponsorship of General Foods and its products.

Notable guest stars
 Farrah Fawcett played a showgirl in "Millie the Model" (October 20, 1969).
 Jodie Foster, sister of regular cast member Buddy Foster, played a fairy in "The Church Play" (November 18, 1968) and a little girl in "All for Charity" (October 12, 1970).
 Teri Garr played a cashier in "Miss Farmerette" (December 23, 1968).
 Will Geer played Captain Wolford in "Aunt Bee's Cruise" (part one on January 13, 1969; part two on January 20, 1969).
 Natalie Schafer played Cornelia Willoughby in "Goober the Housekeeper" (November 9, 1970).

An NBC reunion movie, Return to Mayberry, was produced in 1986 and featured many original performers from The Andy Griffith Show. Ken Berry, Buddy Foster and Arlene Golonka don't appear in the movie, nor do The Andy Griffith Show regulars Frances Bavier, Elinor Donahue, and Jack Burns. Nevertheless, Return does share continuity with the R.F.D. storyline, by maintaining that Andy and Helen are married. However, Andy and Helen's son, Andy Jr., is never mentioned.

Episodes

Home media
On April 8, 2014, Warner Home Video released the first season on DVD in Region 1.

On February 27, 2018, Warner Bros. re-released season 1 on a manufacture-on-demand (MOD) DVD via their Warner Archive Collection.

Reception and ratings

The final episode of The Andy Griffith Show was titled "Mayberry R.F.D." and added an Italian-American family to the Sam Jones homestead. The producers chose to forgo a big overhaul and instead stuck with the winning premise of a widower, his son and the matronly Aunt Bee. Therefore, the series was much the same as The Andy Griffith Show, without Andy Taylor and son Opie.

Mayberry R.F.D. was consistently in the top ten in the Nielsen ratings the first two years of its run, but dropped to number 15 during its third and final season. That year CBS, seeking a more urban image, canceled all its rural-themed shows including Green Acres, Hee Haw and The Beverly Hillbillies in what became known as the "rural purge".

References

Bibliography 
 Fernandes, David; & Dale Robinson. A Guide to Television's "Mayberry R.F.D.", McFarland & Company, Inc, 1999.

External links

 
 
 Mayberry R.F.D. and The Andy Griffith Show background article (archived)

1968 American television series debuts
1971 American television series endings
1960s American sitcoms
1970s American sitcoms
American television spin-offs
CBS original programming
English-language television shows
Television shows set in North Carolina
The Andy Griffith Show